Merseyway Shopping Centre is a shopping complex in Stockport.

Name
The centre's name, Merseyway, comes from the fact that the centre is supported above the River Mersey which runs for the length of the centre.

History

The centre was opened in 1965, as one of the first shopping precincts in the United Kingdom. Since then, it has undergone considerable development.

Merseyway was developed by Hammerson and opened in 1965. It was purchased by Stockport Council in 2016.  

In 2017, the Merseyway car park to the north of the centre (between Princes Street and the M60 motorway) was developed as the Light cinema and Redrock leisure centre.

At the beginning of 2022 it was announced that portions of the Mereseyway’s Adlington Walk will be repurposed to add additional facilities and a new library. Funding for the project was allocated by the government’s Future High Streets Fund (FHSF)

References

External links
Official Website

Buildings and structures in Stockport
Shopping centres in Greater Manchester
River Mersey